András Rosnik (born 31 May 1977) is a Hungarian former competitive ice dancer. With Kornélia Bárány, he is the 1996 Ondrej Nepela Memorial champion and the 1998 Hungarian national champion. They competed together at three ISU Championships and four Grand Prix events.

Bárány and Rosnik trained mainly in Budapest, coached by Gabriella Remport. After their partnership ended, he competed with Patricia Pavuk.

Programs 
(with Bárány)

Competitive highlights 
GP: Grand Prix

With Pavuk

With Bárány

References 

1977 births
Hungarian male ice dancers
Living people
Figure skaters from Budapest